The Schock 55, also called the Nelson Marek 55, is an American sailboat that was designed by Bruce Marek of the design firm Nelson Marek, as a racer and first built in 1990.

Production
The design was initially built by Geraghty Marine, who built two boats as the Nelson Marek 55, and then by W. D. Schock Corp, who acquired the molds and also built two boats as the Schock 55, with production running from 1990 to 1991.

Design
The Schock 55 is a racing keelboat, built predominantly of fiberglass, with wood trim. It has a masthead sloop rig, a raked stem, a sharply reverse transom, an internally mounted spade-type rudder controlled by a wheel and a fixed fin keel. It displaces  and carries  of ballast.

Operational history
In a 1991 review in Cruising World by Quentin Warren wrote, "long and lean, carrying a deep keel and a tall rig, the new 55-foot ULDB offered this year by the W.D. Schock Corporation is a striking Bruce Marek design with serious racing potential and a one-design slant."

See also
List of sailing boat types

References

Keelboats
1990s sailboat type designs
Sailing yachts
Sailboat type designs by Bruce Marek
Sailboat types built by Geraghty Marine
Sailboat types built by W. D. Schock Corp